Balestri is an Italian surname. Notable people with the surname include:

Andrea Balestri (born 1963), Italian actor
Daniele Balestri (born 1978), Italian cyclist
Iacopo Balestri (born 1975), Italian footballer
Marco Balestri (born 1953), Italian author and radio talk show host

Italian-language surnames